Douglas Samuel Charles Dare (born 6 June 1990) is a British singer-songwriter, based in London.

Biography
Dare is from Bridport, Dorset, England. He is the son of a piano teacher and he studied music at The Liverpool Institute for Performing Arts. He is openly gay and has a drag persona under the name of Visa Reasons.

He released his debut EP, Seven Hours on Erased Tapes in 2013 and toured Europe with label mate Ólafur Arnalds. He released his debut album Whelm on May 12, 2014, on Erased Tapes, and supported label mate Nils Frahm on his North American Tour. In October 2016, he released his second album Aforger on Erased Tapes.

Discography

Extended plays

Studio albums

References

Other sources
Seven Hours EP Review  by Drowned In Sound
Seven Hours EP Review by The Line of Best Fit
Seven Hours EP Review by Bearded Magazine
EP track Lungful premiere on Mary Anne Hobbs BBC6 Music Show

External links

Official website 
Biography at Erased Tapes

1990 births
Living people
People from South West England
English male singer-songwriters
English LGBT songwriters
English LGBT singers
Erased Tapes Records artists
Chamber pop musicians
Art pop musicians
21st-century English LGBT people